Yang Chuantang (born May 1954) is a Chinese politician who served as the Minister of Transport of the People's Republic of China from 2012 to 2016. He has also served as the vice chairman of the State Ethnic Affairs Commission, governor of Qinghai Province, party chief of the Tibet Autonomous Region, and one of the vice chairmen of the 9th Chinese People's Political Consultative Conference.

Biography
Yang was born in Yucheng, Shandong province. He jointed the military at age 18. During the Cultural Revolution, he worked on a rural cooperative, then was transferred to work at a petrochemicals factory, where he ascended the ranks to become supervisor and party secretary. He joined the Communist Youth League and then the Chinese Communist Party in 1976, the year Mao died.  He then took part in the production of ethylene at the Qilu Petrochemicals Company in his home province. He studied Chinese between 1981 and 1983 at Shandong Normal University. In August 1987, he was named deputy head of the Communist Youth League of Shandong province. In January 1992, he was sent to become head commissioner (mayor equivalent) of Dezhou prefecture. In November 1993, he was transferred to Tibet to serve as a member of the regional Party Standing Committee and Executive Vice Chairman.

In 1996, he studied Tibetan affairs at the Central Party School and described being "fascinated with" Tibet and its "long hours of sunshine, rich water resources, and diversified geological and climate conditions".

Having worked in the petrochemical industry, he was appointed governor of Qinghai Province from January to December 2004. His promotion to Communist Party Secretary of the Tibet Autonomous Region from December 2004 to November 2005 was seen as part of a trend in appointing "more highly educated and competent" administrators to lead provincial governments. It was said that Yang suffered a stroke in September 2005; he was supposedly sent to Beijing for medical treatment, but this was never confirmed by the authorities. Zhang Qingli was appointed in Yang's stead, and Yang was given a minor leadership position with the State Ethnic Affairs Commission, while maintaining his provincial-ministerial rank.

In August 2012, Yang Chuangtang was appointed to succeed Li Shenglin as Minister of Transport.  At the first plenary session of the 12th National People's Congress in March 2013, he was endorsed for the position by the national legislature.

Yang was an alternate member of the 16th Central Committee of the Chinese Communist Party, and a full member of the 17th and 18th Central Committees.

References

External links
  Biography of Yang Chuantang, Xinhua News Agency.

1954 births
Living people
Governors of Qinghai
Politicians from Dezhou
People's Republic of China politicians from Shandong
Chinese Communist Party politicians from Shandong
Political office-holders in Tibet
Ministers of Transport of the People's Republic of China
Vice Chairpersons of the National Committee of the Chinese People's Political Consultative Conference